Marie-Thérèse de France may refer to:

Princess Marie-Thérèse of France (1667 – 1672) - eldest surviving daughter of Louis XIV and Infanta María Teresa of Spain; known as la Petite Madame
Princess Marie-Thérèse of France (1746 – 1748) - first child of Louis, Dauphin of France and Infanta Maria Teresa Rafaela of Spain
Marie-Thérèse-Charlotte of France (1778 – 1851) - eldest daughter of Louis XVI of France and his wife Marie Antoinette; married Louis-Antoine, Duke of Angoulême